Miss Universe 1965, the 14th Miss Universe pageant, was held on 24 July 1965 at the Miami Beach Auditorium in Miami Beach, Florida, United States.  Apasra Hongsakula of Thailand was crowned by Corinna Tsopei of Greece.

Results

Placements

Contestants

  - Dorinda Croes
  - Pauline Verey
  - Karin Ingberg Schmidt
  - Janet Thompson
  - Lucy Emilie Nossent
  - Elaine Simons
  - Patricia Estensoro Terazas
  - Maria Raquel Helena De Andrade
  - Cheryl Viola Cheeng
  - Carol Ann Tidey
  - Shirlene Minerva De Silva
  - María Victoria Ocampo Gómez
  - Mercedes Pinagal
  - Alina De Varona
  - Ninfa Elveria Palm
  - Jeannette Christjansen
  - Patricia Susana Ballesteros
  - Jennifer Warren Gurley
  - Virpi Liisa Miettinen
  - Marie-Therese Tullio
  - Ingrid Bethke
  - Aspa Theologitou
  - Anja Christina Maria Schuit
  - Joy Drake
  - Bára Magnúsdóttir
  - Persis Khambatta †
  - Anne Elizabeth Neill
  - Aliza Sadeh
  - Erika Jorger
  - Virginia Hope Redpath
  - Mari Katayama
  - Kim Eun-ji
  - Marie-Anne Geisen
  - Patricia Amelia Augustus †
  - Juana Jeanine Acosta Cohen
  - Gay Lorraine Phelps
  - Britt Aaberg
  Okinawa - Leiko Arakaki
  - Sonia Inés Ríos †
  - Stella Castell Vallet
  - Frieda Holler Figallo
  - Louise Patricia Aurelio Vail
  - Maria Do Como Paraiso Sancho
  - Gloria Cobían Díaz
  - Mary Young
  - Veronika Edelgarda Hilda Prigge
  - Alicia Borras
  - Ingrid Norman
  - Yvette Revelly
  - Apasra Hongsakula
  - Dolly Allouche
  - Nebahat Çehre
  - Sue Ann Downey
  - Sonia Raquel Gorbarán Barsante
  - María Auxiliadora de las Casas McGill †
  - Joan Boull

Notes

Did not compete
  - Mabel Azucena Caffarone, Nelida Jukna

Awards
  - Miss Amity (Ingrid Bethke)
  - Miss Photogenic (Karin Ingberg Schmidt)
  - Best National Costume (Sue Downey)

General References

References

1965
1965 beauty pageants
1965 in Florida
Beauty pageants in the United States
Events in Miami Beach, Florida
July 1965 events in the United States